Nagercoil is an assembly constituency located in Kanniyakumari Lok Sabha constituency in Kanyakumari district in Tamil Nadu. It is one of the 234 State Legislative Assembly Constituencies in Tamil Nadu, in India.

The Nadar community is the biggest community in this constituency with around 55% population.

The population of other communities are: Meenavar 12%, Paraiyar 10%, Pillaimar 8% and Muslims 5%.

In the 2021 MLA election, M.R Gandhi of BJP party is said to have won with the help of Christian Nadars, because the DMK party's candidate was a Chettiyar while the BJP party's candidate was a Hindu Nadar.

Though generally Christian Nadars do not vote for BJP, it is said that a substantial number of Christian Nadars voted for the Hindu Nadar candidate M.R Gandhi of BJP.

If the DMK party had fielded a Hindu Nadar candidate instead of a Chettiyar candidate, DMK might have won in 2021.

Travancore-cochin assembly

Madras State assembly

Tamil Nadu assembly

Election results

2021

2016

2011

2006

2001

1996

1991

1989

1984

1980

1977

1971

1967

1962

1957

1954

1952

References 

 

Assembly constituencies of Tamil Nadu
Nagercoil